The 1931–32 Sussex County Football League season was the 12th in the history of the competition.

League table
The league featured 12 clubs which competed in the last season, no new clubs joined the league this season.

League table

References

1931-32
9